MS Stena Germanica may refer to: 

 Stena Germanica (built 1967) – Renamed , ran aground and wrecked near Isla de Mona, Puerto Rico in 1985, and whose wreck was eventually scrapped in situ in 1990
 Stena Germanica (built 1987) – Now  with Stena Line
  (built 2001) – Current Stena Germanica

Ship names